The following is a list of events affecting Canadian television in 1973. Events listed include television show debuts, finales, cancellations, and channel launches.

Events

Debuts

Ending this year

Television shows

1950s
Country Canada (1954–2007)
CBC News Magazine (1952–1981)
Circle 8 Ranch (1955–1978)
The Friendly Giant (1958–1985)
Hockey Night in Canada (1952–present)
The National (1954–present)
Front Page Challenge (1957–1995)
Wayne and Shuster Show (1958–1989)

1960s
Audubon Wildlife Theatre (1968–1974)
CTV National News (1961–present)
Elwood Glover's Luncheon Date (1963–1975)
Land and Sea (1964–present)
Man Alive (1967–2000)
Mr. Dressup (1967–1996)
The Nature of Things (1960–present, scientific documentary series)
The Pig and Whistle (1967–1977)
Question Period (1967–present, news program)
Reach for the Top (1961–1985)
Singalong Jubilee (1961–1974)
Take 30 (1962–1983)
The Tommy Hunter Show (1965–1992)
University of the Air (1966–1983)
W-FIVE (1966–present, newsmagazine program)

1970s
Anything You Can Do (1971–1974)
Bandwagon with Bob Francis (1972–1975)
The Beachcombers (1972–1990)
Canada AM (1972–present, news program)
Drop-In (1970–1974)Dr. Simon Locke (1971–1974)Headline Hunters (1972–1983)Marketplace (1972–present, newsmagazine program)This Is the Law (1971–1976)This Land'' (1970–1982)

TV movies

Networks and services

Network launches

Television stations

Debuts

Births

See also
 1972 in Canada
 List of Canadian films

References